Benjamin Orzechowski (September 8, 1947 – October 3, 2000), known professionally as Benjamin  Orr, was an American musician best known as the bassist,  co-lead vocalist, and co-founder of the rock band The Cars. He sang lead vocals on several of their best-known songs, including "Just What I Needed", "Let's Go" and "Drive". He also had a moderate solo hit with "Stay the Night".

Orr was posthumously inducted into the Rock and Roll Hall of Fame as a member of The Cars in 2018.

Life and career 
Benjamin Orzechowski was born in Lakewood, Ohio, to parents of Polish, Russian, Czechoslovak and German descent. His family actively supported his musical endeavors. He became proficient in several instruments including the guitar, bass guitar, keyboards, and drums.

Known locally as "Benny 11 Letters", he grew up in Lakewood, Ohio, and Parma, Ohio and attended Valley Forge High School before joining local band the Grasshoppers as lead singer and guitarist in 1964. In 1965, the Grasshoppers released two singles on the Sunburst label: "Mod Socks" and "Pink Champagne (and Red Roses)", the latter written by Orzechowski.

The Grasshoppers were also the house band on the Big 5 Show, a musical variety television show produced by WEWS-TV in Cleveland.  The Grasshoppers dissolved in 1966, when two of the band members were drafted into the U.S. Army, after which Orzechowski joined the band Mixed Emotions, and later the Colours.

Later, Orzechowski was drafted as well, although he received a deferment after approximately a year and a half in the Army.

Orr first met Ric Ocasek in Cleveland in the 1960s after Ocasek saw Orr performing with the Grasshoppers on the Big 5 Show. A few years later, Orr moved to Columbus, Ohio, where he and Ocasek formed a musical partnership that would continue in various incarnations until the break up of The Cars in 1988. After moving to Boston, the two formed a folk band called Milkwood with guitarist James Goodkind.

In 1973, the group released one album, How's the Weather? which failed to chart. Remaining in Boston, Ocasek and Orr then formed another band, Richard and the Rabbits, featuring keyboardist Greg Hawkes, followed by another band, Cap'n Swing, which included guitarist Elliot Easton. After the group broke up in 1976, the four of them and drummer David Robinson formed The Cars.

As a member of The Cars, Orr sang lead vocal on some of the band's best-known songs, including their first hit in the Top 40, "Just What I Needed", "Let's Go," and "Drive", their highest charting single in the United States.

Orr released his only solo album, The Lace, in 1986. He co-wrote the music and lyrics with his longtime girlfriend, Diane Grey Page, who also sang backing vocals and appeared on the album's back cover. The album featured a Top 40 pop hit, "Stay the Night". The song was also a Top 10 album rock hit. An accompanying music video for the song was in heavy rotation on MTV.

A second single, "Too Hot to Stop", was also released, but did not chart in the Billboard Hot 100, though it reached No. 25 on the album rock chart. Orr continued to work with the Cars for one more album, Door to Door, and tour before the group disbanded in 1988, after which he and the other members pursued solo work. Sometime in the mid 1990s, Orr recorded tracks with guitarist John Kalishes for an unreleased follow up to The Lace.

From 1998 until his death in 2000, he performed with his own band ORR and two side bands, Voices of Classic Rock with Mickey Thomas and John Cafferty,
and cover band Big People, with Pat Travers (of the Pat Travers Band), Jeff Carlisi (of 38 Special), Derek St. Holmes (of Ted Nugent), and Liberty DeVitto (of Billy Joel).

Orr was married twice and had one son.

Illness and death 
In April 2000, Orr was diagnosed with pancreatic cancer and hospitalized. However, he continued to perform with the band Big People throughout that summer at music festivals and state fairs. He reunited with The Cars one last time in Atlanta, for an interview that was included in the Rhino Records concert video The Cars Live.

Orr died of pancreatic cancer at his home in Atlanta on October 3, 2000, at the age of 53. He had made his final public appearance six days earlier, performing with Big People in Anchorage, Alaska; bandmates Jeff Carlisi, Derek St. Holmes and Rob Wilson were at Orr's bedside when he died.

Ric Ocasek wrote and recorded the song "Silver" as a musical tribute to Orr. It appeared on Ocasek's 2005 solo album, Nexterday. The Cars reunited ten years after Orr's death and released their seventh studio album, Move Like This, in May 2011. Orr was given special thanks in the liner notes: "Ben, your spirit was with us on this one."

Discography

Solo albums 
 The Lace (1986) – US# 86

With the Grasshoppers 
 "Mod Socks" b/w "Twin Beat" (1965) Sunburst Records
 "Pink Champagne (and Red Roses)" b/w "The Wasp" (1965) Sunburst Records

With Milkwood 
 How's the Weather? (1973)

With the Cars 
 The Cars (1978)
 Candy-O (1979)
 Panorama (1980)
 Shake It Up (1981)
 Heartbeat City (1984)
 Door to Door (1987)

Solo singles

References

External links 
 [https://benjaminorrthelega.wixsite.com/thelegacy
[ Benjamin Orr biography] – Allmusic

Benjamin Orr—Find a Grave

1947 births
2000 deaths
20th-century American singers
American new wave musicians
American people of Czech descent
American people of German descent
American people of Polish descent
American people of Russian descent
American rock bass guitarists
American male bass guitarists
American rock singers
American tenors
Burials in Ohio
Deaths from cancer in Georgia (U.S. state)
The Cars members
Deaths from pancreatic cancer
Male new wave singers
Musicians from Atlanta
Musicians from Cleveland
People from Lakewood, Ohio
Singers from Ohio
Guitarists from Georgia (U.S. state)
Guitarists from Ohio
20th-century American bass guitarists
20th-century American male singers
Elektra Records artists